The Bararati Sustainable Development Reserve''' is a sustainable development reserve in the state of Amazonas, Brazil.

Location

The Bararati Sustainable Development Reserve (RDS) is in the municipality of Apuí, Amazonas.
It is on the left (west) bank of the Juruena River, which forms the boundary between Amazonas and Mato Grosso, above the point where that river is joined by the Teles Pires River to form the Tapajós.

The Apiacás Ecological Reserve is opposite the Bararati RDS on the east side of the Juruena in Mato Grosso.
The southern section of the Juruena National Park, also in Mato Grosso, is to the southeast of the reserve.
The Sucunduri State Park is to the south of the reserve, and the Apuí State Forest is to the west of the reserve.
The northern section of the Juruena National Park is to the north of the reserve.

Environment

The mosaic includes terra firma forest, flooded forest, campos rupestres, campina and campinarana.
It contains the headwaters of the Acari and Sucunduri rivers.
The Monte Cristo rapids and the  Falls (Saltos do Rio Sucunduri'') are well-known attractions.
The region has more than 13 endemic species of primates.
Surveys of the west of the mosaic have identified 850 tree species, 46 mammals, more than 300 birds, 27 reptiles, 30 amphibians and almost 100 species of fish.

History

The Bararati Sustainable Development Reserve was created by Amazonas state decree 24.813 of 25 January 2005 with the objective of preserving nature, sustain and improve the livelihoods, quality of life and exploitation of natural resources by the traditional population, and to preserve and enhance knowledge and techniques of managing the environment developed by the traditional population.
The reserve is an integral part of the Apuí Mosaic, which totals  in area and contains the Guariba and Sucunduri State Parks; Bararati and Aripuanã sustainable development reserves; Guariba Extractive Reserve; and Sucunduri, Aripuanã, Apuí and Manicoré state forests.
The management plan for the Apuí Mosaic was approved on 22 September 2010.
This was treated as the management plan for each of the conservation units as well as for the mosaic itself.
As of 2016 the reserve was supported by the Amazon Region Protected Areas Program.

Notes

Sources

Sustainable development reserves of Brazil
Protected areas of Amazonas (Brazilian state)
2005 establishments in Brazil